Daniel Van Ryckeghem (29 May 1945 – 26 May 2008) was a Belgian professional road bicycle racer.

Major results

1966
1st GP Briek Schotte
 1st Stage 3 Tour du Nord
2nd Kampioenschap van Vlaanderen
3rd Grand Prix d'Isbergues
1967
 1st Ruddervoorde Koerse
 Volta a Catalunya
1st  Points classification
 1st Stages 2, 6 & 10
 Tour de Suisse
1st  Points classification
 1st Stage 1
 1st Wortegem
 1st Halle–Ingooigem
 1st Dwars door Vlaanderen
 1st Kuurne–Brussels–Kuurne
 1st Rund um den Henninger-Turm
 1st Omloop der Zuid-West-Vlaamse Bergen
 1st Stage 1 (TTT) Tour of Belgium
 3rd Overall Tweedaagse van Bertrix
 3rd Omloop van het Houtland
 3rd Brussel-Bever
 3rd Wattrelos-Meulebeke
 1st Stage 1
 6th Road race, UCI Road World Championships
1968
Tour de France:
1st stages 3 (TTT), 8 & 11
 Tour de Suisse
1st  Points classification
 1st Stage 3 & 10
1st Omloop van het Zuidwesten
7th Overall Four Days of Dunkirk
1st Stage 1
1st Gavere
1st Moorslede
1st Arras
1st Beernem
2nd Kuurne–Brussels–Kuurne
3rd Amstel Gold Race
 3rd Wattrelos-Meulebeke
 3rd Omloop der Vlaamse Gewesten
1969
1st Omloop van de Grensstreek
1st Leeuwse Pijl
1st Omloop van Oost-Vlaanderen
1st Deinze
1st Hooglede
 3rd Circuit de la Region Liniere
2nd GP de Denain
2nd Omloop Het Volk
5th Overall Tour du Nord
1st Stage 5
1970
1st Dwars door Vlaanderen
1st E3 Prijs Vlaanderen
1st Elfstedenronde
1st Nationale Sluitingsprijs
1st Stage 1 Critérium du Dauphiné Libéré
2nd Omloop van het Houtland
 3rd Kuurne–Brussels–Kuurne
 3rd Omloop van het Waasland
1971
1st Grand Prix d'Isbergues
1st Ruiselede
1st Lokeren
 3rd Circuit de la Region Liniere
 3rd Circuit du Port de Dunkerque
1972
 3rd Étoile de Bessèges

References

External links 

Official Tour de France results for Daniel van Ryckeghem

1945 births
2008 deaths
Belgian male cyclists
Belgian Tour de France stage winners
People from Meulebeke
Tour de Suisse stage winners
Cyclists from West Flanders